The hooked squid, family Onychoteuthidae, currently comprise about 20–25 species (several known from only single life stages and thus unconfirmed), in six or seven genera. They range in mature mantle length from 7 cm to a suggested length of 2 m for the largest member, Onykia robusta. The family is characterised by the presence of hooks only on the tentacular clubs, a simple, straight, funnel–mantle locking apparatus, and a 'step' inside the jaw angle of the lower beak. With the exception of the Arctic Ocean, the family is found worldwide.

Species

Genus Onychoteuthis Lichtenstein, 1818
Onychoteuthis banksii (Leach, 1817) – common clubhook squid
Onychoteuthis bergii* Lichtenstein, 1818
Onychoteuthis mollis* Appelloef, 1891
Onychoteuthis compacta Berry, 1913
Onychoteuthis borealijaponica Okada, 1927 – boreal clubhook squid
Onychoteuthis meridiopacifica Rancurel & Okutani, 1990
Onychoteuthis lacrima Bolstad & Seki in Bolstad, 2008
Onychoteuthis prolata Bolstad, Vecchione & Young in Bolstad, 2008
Onychoteuthis horstkottei Bolstad, 2010
Genus Onykia Lesueur, 1821  (includes most species previously placed in Moroteuthis)
Subgenus Onykia
Onykia carriboea Lesueur, 1821 – tropical clubhook squid
Onykia robusta (Verrill, 1876) – robust clubhook squid
Onykia loennbergii (Ishikawa & Wakiya, 1914) – Japanese hooked squid
Onykia aequatorialis* Thiele, 1920
Onykia robsoni (Adam, 1962) – rugose hooked squid
Onykia indica* Okutani, 1981
Subgenus Moroteuthopsis
Onykia ingens (Smith, 1881) – greater hooked squid
incertae sedis
?Onykia appelloefi* Pfeffer, 1900
Genus Ancistroteuthis Gray, 1849
Ancistroteuthis lichtensteinii (Ferussac, 1835) – angel clubhook squid or angel squid
Genus Kondakovia Filippova, 1972
Kondakovia longimana Filippova, 1972
Kondakovia nigmatullini Laptikhovsky, Arkhipkin & Bolstad, 2008
Genus Notonykia Nesis, Roeleveld & Nikitina, 1998
Notonykia africanae Nesis, Roeleveld & Nikitina, 1998
Notonykia nesisi Bolstad, 2007
Genus Filippovia Bolstad, 2010
Filippovia knipovitchi (Filippova, 1972) – smooth hooked squid
Genus Walvisteuthis Nesis & Nikitina, 1986
Walvisteuthis jeremiahi Vecchione, Sosnowski & Young, 2015
Walvisteuthis rancureli (Okutani, 1981)
Walvisteuthis virilis Nesis & Nikitina, 1986
Walvisteuthis youngorum (Bolstad, 2010)

(*) indicates taxa requiring further taxonomic investigation

References

Bolstad, K.S.R. 2008. Systematics of the Onychoteuthidae Gray, 1847 (Cephalopoda: Oegopsida). Doctoral thesis.
Bolstad, K.S.R. 2010. Systematics of the Onychoteuthidae Gray, 1847 (Cephalopoda: Oegopsida). Zootaxa 2696: 1–186. Preview

External links
 Tree of Life: Onychoteuthidae

Onychoteuthidae discussion forum at TONMO.com
Laptikhovsky, V.; Arkhipkin, A.; Bolstad, K.S. 2008. A second species of the squid genus Kondakovia (Cephalopoda: Onychoteuthidae) from the sub-Antarctic.

Squid
Taxa named by John Edward Gray